Ionomidotis is a genus of fungi belonging to the family Cordieritidaceae.

The species of this genus are found in Eurasia and Northern America.

Species:
 Ionomidotis fulvotingens (Berk. & M.A.Curtis) E.K.Cash

References

Fungi